Pentti Laaksonen (13 January 1929 – 29 April 2005) was a Finnish basketball player. He competed in the men's tournament at the 1952 Summer Olympics. Laaksonen lived his last years in Spain.

References

1929 births
2005 deaths
Finnish men's basketball players
Olympic basketball players of Finland
Basketball players at the 1952 Summer Olympics
Sportspeople from Helsinki
Finnish expatriate basketball people in Spain